Cryptandra nola is a flowering plant in the family Rhamnaceae and is endemic to the western region of Western Australia. It is an erect or spreading, spiny shrub with oblong to elliptic leaves and clusters of white, tube-shaped flowers.

Description
The upper surface of the leaves is minutely hairy to glabrous, the lower surface mostly concealed. Flowering mainly occurs from June to August, and the fruit is a schizocarp.

Taxonomy and naming
Cryptandra nola was first formally described in 1995 by Barbara Lynette Rye in the journal Nuytsia from specimens collected near Mullewa in 1994. The specific epithet (nola ) means "small bell", referring to the shape of the flowers.

Distribution and habitat
This cryptandra grows in sandy soil over granite in the Avon Wheatbelt and Geraldton Sandplains bioregions of  Western Australia.

Conservation status
Cryptandra nola is listed as "Priority Three" by the Government of Western Australia Department of Biodiversity, Conservation and Attractions, meaning that it is poorly known and known from only a few locations but is not under imminent threat.

References

nola
Rosales of Australia
Flora of Western Australia
Plants described in 1995
Taxa named by Barbara Lynette Rye